The Letka is a river in the Komi Republic and Kirov Oblast in Russia. It is a right tributary of the Vyatka. The Letka is navigable along its lower reaches.

References

Rivers of the Komi Republic
Rivers of Kirov Oblast